The World According To Gob  is the third studio album by Canadian punk rock band Gob, and was released in Canada on October 10, 2000. It includes the singles "I Hear You Calling", "For The Moment", "No Regrets" and radio only single "That's The Way".  The album was certified Gold in Canada on May 2, 2002. "I Hear You Calling" was re-recorded for the band's next album Foot in Mouth Disease which was released three years later.

Track listing
 "For the Moment" - 3:29 
 "I Hear You Calling" - 3:12 
 "No Regrets" - 2:34 
 "Everyone Pushed Down" - 3:07 
 "Pinto" - 2:38 
 "Looking for California" - 3:59 
 "Sleepyhead" - 4:01 
 "Ex-Shuffle" - 2:42 
 "That's the Way" - 2:45 
 "Been So Long" - 3:14 
 "144" - 3:17 
 "Can I Resist" - 2:30 
 "Desktop Breaking" - 3:02 
 "Perfect Remedy" - 7:37 (Includes hidden track)

Personnel
 Theo - Guitar, Lead Vocals on tracks 3, 8, 9, 12 and Backing Vocals
 Tom - Guitar, Lead Vocals on tracks 1, 2, 4, 5, 6, 7, 10, 11, 13, 14 and Backing Vocals
 Craig - Bass, Backing Vocals
 Gabe - Drums, Backing Vocals
 Vasilis - Backing vocals
 Neill King - Producer, engineer, mixing, backing vocals
 Blair Calibaba - Engineer, mixing
 Sheldon Zaharko - 2nd engineer
 Stephanie Hill - 2nd engineer
 Shaun Thingvold - 2nd engineer
 Eddy Schreyer - Mastering

Trivia
The album's title alludes to The World According to Garp, a novel by John Irving.

References

2000 albums
Gob (band) albums
Nettwerk Records albums